ucspi-tcp is a public domain Unix TCP command-line tool for building TCP client-server applications.  It consists of super-server tcpserver and tcpclient application.

From "Life with qmail", Dave Sill, 2 January 2006 (Appendix B.3.):  ucspi-tcp is an acronym for UNIX Client-Server Program Interface for TCP, and it is pronounced ooks-pie tee see pee.

tcpserver features built-in TCP Wrapper-like access control.

ucspi-tcp competes with several other programs 
mconnect client supplied as part of SunOS
faucet and hose, part of the netpipes package
netcat

External links
 http://cr.yp.to/ucspi-tcp.html

Unix network-related software
Transmission Control Protocol
Public-domain software with source code